The 1997 Cornwall County Council election, was an election for all 79 seats on the council. Cornwall County Council was a county council that covered the majority of the ceremonial county of Cornwall, with the exception of the Isles of Scilly which had an independent local authority. The elections took place concurrently with other local elections across England and Northern Ireland. The Liberal Democrats lost control of the council, which fell under no overall control.

Election result 

|}

References

External links 

1997 English local elections
1997
1990s in Cornwall